This is a complete list of ice hockey players who have played for the Tampa Bay Lightning in the National Hockey League (NHL). It includes players that have played at least one regular season or playoff game for the Tampa Bay Lightning since the franchise was established in 1992. Founded in 1992 as an expansion team along with the Ottawa Senators, 436 different players have played with the Lightning. The Lightning have won three Stanley Cup championships: 2004, 2020, and 2021. They also reached the Stanley Cup Finals in 2015 and in 2022. The Lightning have had five players, Dave Andreychuk, Dino Ciccarelli, Mark Recchi, Denis Savard, and Martin St. Louis, inducted into the Hockey Hall of Fame.

As of June 27, 2021, 51 goaltenders and 385 skaters (forwards and defensemen) have appeared in at least one regular-season and/or playoff game with the Tampa Bay Lightning since the team joined the league in the 1992–93 NHL season. The 436 all-time members of the Lightning are listed below, with statistics complete through the end of the 2021–22 season.

Key
  Stanley Cup winner, Hockey Hall of Famer, or retired number.
  Appeared in a Lightning game during the 2021–22 season.
  Stanley Cup winner and appeared in a Lightning game during the 2021–22 season.

The "Seasons" column lists the first year of the season of the player's first game and the last year of the season of the player's last game. For example, a player who played one game in the 2000–2001 season would be listed as playing with the team from 2000–2001, regardless of what calendar year the game occurred within.

Statistics complete as of the 2021–2022 NHL season.

Goaltenders

Skaters

Notes

References
Tampa Bay Lightning all-time roster on the Internet Hockey Database
Tampa Bay Lightning all-time roster at legendsofhockey.net
Tampa Bay Lightning all-time roster at the Tampa Bay Lightning Official Site

Tampa Bay Lightning
 
players